is a 1957 black-and-white Japanese horror film directed by Kyotaro Namiki and written by Akira Sugimoto.

Cast 
 Shōji Nakayama
 Kazuko Wakasugi
 Shigeru Amachi

Legacy
The film is best known for its association with the SNES game EarthBound. Its creator, Shigesato Itoi, accidentally walked in on the film as a child and mistook a murder scene for a rape scene, which traumatised him and inspired the eerie dialogue during the game's final boss battle with Giygas.

References

External links 
 

Japanese black-and-white films
1957 films
Films directed by Kyōtarō Namiki
1950s Japanese films